Nikola Jovanović (born 7 March 1981) is a Serbian former professional basketball player.

Playing career 
Jovanović played professional basketball in Serbia (Mašinac, Ergonom Best, Swisslion Takovo, Vojvodina), Cyprus (ETHA Engomis, APOEL), Greece (Union Kavala), Poland (Stal Ostrów Wielkopolski and Anwil Włocławek), Romania (Timișoara), Hungary (KTE-Duna Aszfalt).

On November 25, 2016, Jovanović signed for the French team Berck.

References

External links
 Player Profile at eurobasket.com
 Player Profile at proballers.com

1981 births
Living people
APOEL B.C. players
Kavala B.C. players
KK Ergonom players
KK Lions/Swisslion Vršac players
KK Mašinac players
KK Joker players
KK Vojvodina players
KK Włocławek players
CEP Lorient players
Kecskeméti TE (basketball) players
Serbian men's basketball players
Serbian expatriate basketball people in Cyprus
Serbian expatriate basketball people in France
Serbian expatriate basketball people in Greece
Serbian expatriate basketball people in Poland
Serbian expatriate basketball people in Romania
Serbian expatriate basketball people in Hungary
People from Odžaci
Power forwards (basketball)